Hand feel (Hand, Fabric hand, Fabric feel) is the property of fabrics related to the touch that expresses sensory comfort. It refers to the way fabrics feel against the skin or in the hand and conveys information about the cloth's softness and smoothness. Hand feel is an estimated and subjective property of different fabrics, but nowadays, hand feel could be measured and assessed statistically.

Tactile senses 
Our daily life experiences are profoundly influenced by the sense of touch. Touch is the first sense to develop, beginning in the first trimester of pregnancy. During the next few months in the womb, the baby's entire body develops touch receptors. Around 7 weeks into pregnancy, touch is the first sense to develop in the fetus. Therefore, hand feel is an important characteristic of clothing that provides sensory comfort.

Hand feel (also called handle or drape) is one of the basic characteristics that are necessary for sensory comfort that is related to tactile comfort. It is related to the friction between the clothes and the body. It is associated with smoothness, roughness, softness, and stiffness of clothing material. The degree of tactile discomfort may vary with individuals. Some of the terms that describe the tactile sensations are clingy, sticky, scratchy, prickly, soft, stiff, heavy, light and hard.

Terms 
There are different terms in use for describing the softness of textile materials. Wool trade term for the same is ''Handle'' or ''A good handling''. The opposing term is 'A poor handling' that suggests the material's poor or harsh hand feel.

Objective 
Fabrics during manufacturing becomes harsh that is undesirable hence they are made soft again for end users or useful input materials for subsequent processes. The hand feel matters in selecting the fabrics for a particular category or line; for instance, softer clothes are preferred for children. Ladies' clothes are designed with lighter and softer than men's cloth.

Softening and stiffening 
Softening finishes are aimed to make materials, soft, in against to that stiffening finishes are intended to make materials, stiff in order to prevent sagging. Stiffening adds crispiness to the light sheer fabrics. Stiffening involves the application of thermoplastic resins and polymers. Parchmentising is a kind of finish that stiffens the treated cellulosic materials while imparting translucency.

More objectives of hand feel are:

Fabric drape 
Drape (draping or fabric drape) is the property of different textile materials how they fold, fall, or hang along with a three-dimensional body. Draping depends upon the fiber characteristics and the flexibility, looseness, and softness of the material.Drape finishes can also alter the draping properties of clothes. Draping clothes embrace feminine beauty.

Loft 
Hand feel adds compression resiliency; Soft fabrics tend to spring back to their original shape.

Sewability 
Soft fabrics are more compatible in sewing. Softness improves the sewability of the fabrics. Handfeel helps not only in selling the goods and comfort but also aid in sewing (avoids stitching holes).

Factors 
Hand feel may vary with the composition, various yarn parameters (such as hairiness, twist and yarn count), and gsm (fabric weight), and fabric construction. Some undesired acid, alkaline, and temperature treatments can make certain fabrics harsher.

The judgement of fabrics on the scale of soft to harsh is affected by the following parameters.

Fiber properties and yarn 
The staple length and diameter of the constituting fibers affect the softness of the materials. More considerable fiber length needs less twisting, and loosely twisted yarns tend to have a softer hand feel. Examples are egyptian, and pima cotton is softer than cotton with shorter fibers. The same is with Silk, and synthetic fibers that have infinite length are softer.

Surface contour 
The surface contour of the fiber characterizes its outer surface along its shaft and may be rough, smooth, scaly, serrated, convoluted, or striated, all of which contribute to the friction, softness, and texture. The property is important for the texture and hand feel of the fabric that is made.

Fabric construction and thickness 
The fabric construction and thickness of the cloth can present harsh or soft handfeel. Usually, the fine and lightweight structures with loose weave or knit constructions are more delicate until the twisted or textured yarns are not used. On the other hand, heavy, and thicker fabrics could be soft or harsh depending upon the after treatments and varied yarn forms.

Process 
The feel of some fabrics like silk (satin), fine muslins, rayon (modal or lyocell), nylon and microfibers' fabrics are naturally soft. Still, in large, it is manipulated with different processes and finishing techniques. Fabric softeners and certain surface finishes such as napping help improve the hand feel of fabrics.

Fabric softeners 
Fabric softeners are substances that aid in the softening, durability, and drape of fabrics. Softeners also help in providing body to the fabrics and they facilitate other finishing processes, such as wrinkle resistance finish where fabrics become stiffened due to the finish. Silicone compounds, substituted ammonium compounds, fats, wax emulsions, and oils are the most commonly used softening agents.

Surface finishes

Surface finishes are the treatments that alter the surface and feel of the textiles. They include several mechanical and chemical applications.

Mechanical

Napping 
Napping or Raising produces a soft and fibrous surface, it is a mechanical finish. A machine equipped with metallic wires that breaks the yarns and creates a fibrous surface on the surface.

Sueding 
Sueding is a similar finish to napping, but it's a delicate finish; the arrangements on the machine, such as bristles, are softer.

Shearing
Shearing improves the appearance and feel of the fabric by cutting the loops or raised surface to a uniform and even height.

Chemical

Mercerizing 
Mercerizing improves the characteristics of the cellulosic materials and improves the feel and aesthetics of the treated fabrics.

Deweighting
Deweighting, or weight reduction, is a treatment for polyester to make it like silk. The treatment peels the surface and reduces the fiber weight and strength while making them softer and finer. Additionally, the treatment enhances the absorbency of the treated substrates.

Bio polishing 
Bio polishing or Enzyme wash is applicable in cellulosic fibers; it is a cellulase enzyme treatment that helps cut protruding fibers and produce a clean, lustrous and softer material.

Functional finishes 
Functional finishes add value other than handfeel and aesthetics. Moisture wicking is an example of functional finish that enhances the wearer's comfort.

Testing 
So far, hand feel has been a subjectively judged parameter based on manual touch. But now, there are hand feel testers that can evaluate the quality with parameters of bending, roughness, compression, and friction.

Tests 
One of the instrumental test methods is  "AATCC TM 202:2014," which measures the "feels and looks" similar to manual sensory perceptions.

Kawabata evaluation system 
The Kawabata evaluation system predicts human responses and understands the perception of softness. Additionally, it can be used to determine the transient heat transfer properties associated with the sensation of coolness generated when fabrics come into contact with the skin while being worn.

Interactive touch-activated display 
The interactive touch-activated display, also known as the "iTad," is a device equipped with multitouch sensing that can help feel images on a touch screen.

How different fabrics feel when someone judges them manually 
Manually evaluating the fabric's feel is subjective. Perceptions of different people may differ. Skillful assessment may require experience in the handling of different fabrics. Thermal conductivity also plays a role in how different fabrics feel.
 Cotton, linen, and rayon are good conductors of heat. The heat from the finger may be lost on touching while judging. Thus, these fibers "feel cool to the touch."
 Wool feels warm as it is not a good conductor of heat. The heat is not lost when someone puts his/her finger on the fabric of wool, it remains there and that is why the wool feels warm. Wool has elasticity and is springy as well.
 Silk, like wool, feels warm. It is elastic and feels smooth.

See also 
 Aesthetics (textile)
 Clothing comfort
 Performance (textiles)

References 

Textiles
Clothing industry
Somatosensory system